Lyon Park ( (Lioni Aygi)), popularly known as Tokhmakh, is a public park in the Armenian capital of Yerevan. It occupies an area of 17 hectares in the eastern Erebuni District of the capital city. It is home to an artificial lake called Vardavar, covering an area of 8 hectares.

Description
In 2010-2011, the park was entirely renovated by the direct assistance of the Lyon City Council. It was reopened in July 2011 with the presence of the mayor of Lyon Gérard Collomb and then-mayor of Yerevan Karen Karapetyan. The park was renamed after the city of Lyon to become a symbol of the partnership between the two cities.

The origins of the artificial lake date back to the period of king Argishti I of Urartu during the 8th century BC. In 1578, the lake was renovated by the Turkic ruler of Yerevan Mehmet khan Tokhmakh, and since then it was known as Tokhmakh lake. During the Soviet period the lake was named after the Youth wing of the Communist party. Since 2000, the lake is known with its current name.

The lake, with a water surface of 8 hectares, is frequently used for windsurfing .

Gallery

References

8th-century BC establishments
780s BC
Parks in Yerevan
Urban public parks